Stephen Powys, 6th Baron Lilford (8 March 1869 – 19 September 1949), was a British peer.

Powys was the third son of Thomas Powys, 4th Baron Lilford, and his wife Emma Elizabeth Brandling. His birth was registered a month after he was born by his father and gave his parents as Thomas Littleton Lord Lilford and Emma Elizabeth Lilford. Regrettably there was no space on the form to enter his surname, which was, as his parents had been, Powys; so the index gave him his father's title name as his surname.

He never used the surname of Lilford, he may not even have known that was what was implicit in his birth certificate, though he did become Lord Lilford himself in later life. There is no evidence to show that he was adopted, the evidence is merely that of confusion in the mind of the registrars at the time of registration.

Following the death of his mother Emma in 1884, his father remarried Clementina Georgina Baillie-Hamilton in 1885 in Cookham, Berkshire. He was educated at Sunningdale School, Harrow School, Trinity College, Cambridge and the University of Cambridge.

In 1945, he inherited the title of 6th Baron Lilford from his full brother John Powys, 5th Baron Lilford, but died in 1949 at Marylebone, London. There is a portrait in the National Portrait Gallery, London, of Stephen Powys which dates from 1890.
His estates, which included the Lilford Hall Estate in Northamptonshire, Bank Hall Estate in Lancashire, Bewsey Estate in Cheshire, and his fathers residence in Mayfair, and the title of Baron Lilford passed to George Vernon Powys (his second cousin twice removed) as Stephen never married or had children.

References

1869 births
1949 deaths
Stephen
Place of birth missing
People educated at Sunningdale School
People educated at Harrow School
Alumni of Trinity College, Cambridge